Kaluta may refer to:

Little red kaluta, an Australian marsupial
Michael Kaluta (born 1947), American artist